William Penn is a name given to a number of schools and educational establishments, including:

United States
 William Penn Senior High School, York, Pennsylvania
 William Penn High School (North Carolina), High Point, North Carolina
 William Penn School District, Delaware County, Pennsylvania
 William Penn Charter School, Philadelphia, Pennsylvania
 William Penn High School (Philadelphia), former school in Philadelphia, Pennsylvania
 William Penn High School for Girls, Philadelphia, Pennsylvania
 William Penn High School (Delaware), New Castle, Delaware
William Penn High School in Harrisburg, Pennsylvania, former school building; see Harrisburg High School
 William Penn University, Oskaloosa, Iowa

UK
 The Charter School North Dulwich – previously Dulwich High School and prior to that William Penn School